Roman legion may refer to:

 Roman legion, a type of army unit of Ancient Rome
 List of Roman legions
 Roman army, The Legions or The Roman Legions, the army of Ancient Rome
 Roman Legion (1941–1943), an Aromanian World War II political and paramilitary organization in Greece supporting the Axis occupation of the country

See also
 List of military legions
 Roman Legion-Hare (1955 film) an animated short film featuring Bugs Bunny